A rudder is a steering device. 

Rudder may also refer to:

Rudder (surname)
Camp Rudder, a U.S. Army Ranger School training facility
Rudder Middle School, San Antonio, Texas
Rudder High School, Bryan, Texas
Rudder Point, Leskov Island, South Sandwich Islands
Rudder (software)
The Rudder, magazine